Cheryl Anne Saunders    (born 28 August 1944) is Laureate Professor Emeritus at the University of Melbourne.

Career
Saunders was the first woman to be appointed as a professor in the Law Faculty at University of Melbourne. She was also a founding director of its Centre for Comparative Constitutional Studies.

She has been awarded several honours in recognition of her work. In 1994 she was appointed an officer of the Order of Australia "for service to the law and to public administration" and in 2003 she received the Centenary Medal. In 2005 the University of Cordoba conferred an honorary doctorate on Saunders. She was elected to the Legion of Honour in France for her services to the Académie Internationale de Droit Constitutionnel in 2009. Saunders is a Fellow of the Academy of Social Sciences in Australia and a Foundation Fellow of the Australian Academy of Law. She was elected as a Fellow of the British Academy in July 2018. In 2022 she was awarded the Tang Prize in the category "Rule of Law".

References

1944 births
Living people
Officers of the Order of Australia
Fellows of the British Academy
Academic staff of the University of Melbourne
21st-century Australian lawyers
20th-century Australian lawyers
Recipients of the Legion of Honour
Recipients of the Centenary Medal
Fellows of the Australian Academy of Law
Fellows of the Academy of the Social Sciences in Australia
People from Quetta